This was the first edition of the tournament.

Martina Trevisan won the title, defeating Dalma Gálfi in the final, 4–6, 6–4, 6–0.

Seeds

Draw

Finals

Top half

Bottom half

References

Main Draw

BBVA Open Internacional de Valencia - Singles